Korem 092/Maharajalila or Military Area Command 092nd/Maharajalila is a Military Area Command (Korem) under Kodam VI/Mulawarman. Its garrison located on Tanjung Selor, North Kalimantan. It was created following the separation of North Kalimantan province from East Kalimantan and becoming a new province. It consist of five Military District Commands (Kodim).

Units 

 Kodim 0903/Tanjung Selor
 Kodim 0907/Tarakan
 Kodim 0910/Malinau
 Kodim 0911/Nunukan
 Kodim 0915/Tana Tidung

References 

Military units and formations of Indonesia